The Botho-Lucas-Chor was one of the most famous German vocal ensembles of the 1960s and 1970s.

The choir 
In 1958,  (1923–2012) founded the Lucas Quartet (Botho Lucas, Bernd Golonsky), from which the Botho-Lucas-Chor emerged in 1961 with changing female casts - , Ans Plevier, Daisy Door, Ulla Wiesner, Hanna Dölitsch), first as a studio ensemble with well-known performers but soon with its own, solo works.

Danke, the song with which Martin Gotthard Schneider won the competition for new spiritual songs from the Evangelische Akademie Tutzing, became the first unexpected success for the Botho-Lucas Chor. The song became an evergreen and is still heard in numerous concerts. In the following year, the choir produced two LPs with further modern, spiritual titles, some of which, like Ein Schiff, das sich Gemeinde nennt, turned very popular.

The choir repertoire and interpretations can be described as extraordinarily versatile. It included modern folk tunes, operettas, musicals, hit covers, schlagers in several languages such as the adaptation in German of the title song of the British film Those Magnificent Men in their Flying Machines (Richt’ge Männer wie wir) released in 1965.

On television, the choir was represented in many programs, soloistically and with accompaniment. In addition, choral and solo productions took place with almost all orchestras from the world of radio and television, and the ensemble also played a part in numerous productions of prominent artists of the 1960s as an accompanying choir, among others Wir können uns nur Briefe schreiben by Greetje Kauffeld (1964) and Santo Domingo by Wanda Jackson (1965).

Beside Ralf Paulsen, Daisy Door was one of the well-known soloists who helped the choir achieve its distinctive sound. Daisy Door was famous for the title Du lebst in deiner Welt (You're living in your world) from the television series Der Kommissar. In 1979, the Botho-Lucas Chor went on tour with Bert Kaempfert's orchestra through Germany, Luxembourg and Switzerland, and also performed in the Royal Albert Hall in London.

Discography

Vinyl singles 
EMI Group (year, title, catalog nbr.):
 1961: Valencia / Barcelona – C* 21771
 1961: Berliner Polka / Tango Continental – C 21941
 1962: Förster Toni / Die Züricher Mädels – C 21998
 1962: Afrika-Song / Sahara-Blues – C 22066
 1962: Danke / Antwort auf alle Fragen – E 22073
 1962: Die Regenmelodie / Stadtpark-Serenade – C 22020
 1963: Prinzessin-Serenade / Sweet Clarinet – E 22318
 1963: Ich weiß basaltene Bergeshöh'n / Rhönmarsch – O 22492
 1963: 55 Tage in Peking / Weht der Wind von Westen – E 22494
 1963: Ich zieh' meiner dunklen Straße / Funde am Weg – E 22534
 1963: Ein Schiff, das sich Gemeinde nennt / Gott ist der Herr – E 22539
 1964: Als die Sonne kam / Nur du – E 23302
 1964: Liebeskummer lohnt sich nicht / Junger Mann mit roten Rosen – E 22759
 1965: Topsy / Damals in Jenny's Bar – E 22860
 1965: Wir wandern auf vielen Straßen / Abendglocken – E 22890
 1965: Richt’ge Männer wie wir / Wo sind denn hier die schönen Mädchen – E 23022
 1965: Uns're kleine feine Familie / Ja die kleinen weißen Mäuse – E 23082
 1966: Barkarole der Liebe / Liebe und Liebelei – E 23131
 1966: Als die Sonne kam / Nur du – E 23302
 1967: Lehr mich / Diesen Tag, Herr – E 23580
 1970: Rose vom Rhein / Blumen, Blüten, Bäume – C 29836
 1973: Die Nacht ist sowieso im Eimer / Heute Nacht, da könnt’ ich mich verschenken – C 30493 
 1974: Du wirst nie einsam sein / Liebe im Mai – C 30538
---
* C: Columbia, E: Electrola, O: Odeon

Vinyl longplayings 
(year, title, label)
 1961: Sei lieb zu mir – Electrola 74153
 1962: Danke – Crystal 32792
 1963: Die Landsknechtstrommel – Odeon 77
 1964: Küss mich - Musik zum Träumen und Tanzen – Hörzu / Electrola
 1973: Highway of Songs – Columbia 29465
 1978: Liebst du mich – Electrola 32825
 ?: Operette zum mitsingen – Columbia 23946
 ?: Operette á gogo – mfp 5441
 ?: Küss mich, bitte, bitte küss mich – mfp 5578
 ?: Sei lieb zu mir – Electrola

Bibliography 
 Ingo Grabowsky, Martin Lücke: Die 100 Schlager des Jahrhunderts. Europäische Verlagsanstalt, Hamburg 2008, pp. 174–176 und passim.

External links 

Der Botho-Lucas-Chor on Discogs

Vocal ensembles
Schlager musicians